Lee Sang-Il  (born 25 May 1979) is a South Korean football midfielder, who last played for Changsha Ginde in Chinese Super League. His previous clubs were Beveren and Germinal Beerschot in Belgium and Daegu FC and Chunnam Dragons in K-League.

Club career statistics

External links
 
 Stats at Guardian.co.uk

1979 births
Living people
Association football midfielders
South Korean footballers
South Korean expatriate footballers
K.S.K. Beveren players
Beerschot A.C. players
Daegu FC players
Jeonnam Dragons players
Belgian Pro League players
K League 1 players
Expatriate footballers in Belgium
South Korean expatriate sportspeople in Belgium
Expatriate footballers in China
South Korean expatriate sportspeople in China
Chinese Super League players
Changsha Ginde players